Venezuela men's junior national softball team is the junior national under-17 team for Venezuela. The team competed at the 1997 ISF Junior Men's World Championship in St. John's, Newfoundland where they finished eighth. The team competed at the 2001 ISF Junior Men's World Championship in Sydney, Australia where they finished sixth.  The team competed at the 2008 ISF Junior Men's World Championship in Whitehorse, Yukon where they finished fifth.  The team competed at the 2012 ISF Junior Men's World Championship in Parana, Argentina where they finished ninth.

References

External links 
 International Softball Federation

Softball
Men's junior national softball teams
Softball in Venezuela
Men's sport in Venezuela
Youth sport in Venezuela